Oamo Culbreath (born October 26, 1987 in Kingston, Ontario) is a professional Canadian football offensive lineman who is currently a free agent. He most recently played for the Calgary Stampeders of the Canadian Football League. He was drafted 46th overall by the Stampeders in the 2010 CFL Draft and signed a contract with the team on May 27, 2010. He played college football for the UBC Thunderbirds.

References

1987 births
Living people
Calgary Stampeders players
Canadian football offensive linemen
Players of Canadian football from Ontario
Sportspeople from Kingston, Ontario
UBC Thunderbirds football players